Chinese Burmese, also Sino-Burmese or Tayoke, are a Burmese citizens of full or partial Han Chinese ancestry. They are group of overseas Chinese born or raised in Myanmar (Burma). As of 2012, the Burmese Chinese population is estimated to be as high as 3 per cent of the country's population.

Burmese Chinese are a well established middle class ethnic group and are well represented in all upper levels of Burmese society. Burmese Chinese also play a leading role in Burma's business sector and dominate the Burmese economy. In addition, Burmese Chinese have a strong presence in Burma's political scene with several people such as San Yu, Khin Nyunt, and Ne Win having been major political figures.

Etymology

In the Burmese language, the Chinese are called Tayoke (tarut) and formerly spelt  (tarup). The earliest evidence of this term dates to the Bagan Era, in the 13th century, during which it referred to the territory and a variety of peoples to the north and northeast of Myanmar. Various scholars have proposed that it comes from the Chinese term for "Turk" (突厥, Tūjué / tú jué); from the name of Dali (大理國, Dàlǐguó), the capital of the Kingdom of Nanzhao; a Chinese corruption of the term Dàyuèzhī (大月支 or 大月氏), a Chinese term referring to Mongol-speaking Kushan Huns. The adoption of Tayoke as an exonym for the Han Chinese was not an established practice until the 19th century.

In the 1940s and 1950s, the term paukphaw was co-opted as an affectionate term for the Chinese, and is now typically used in the context of diplomatic ties between China and Myanmar. The term itself purportedly originates from a Burmese myth about the Chinese and Burmese peoples as being descendants of the same parents, a dragon princess and a sun god.

In the Mon language, the Chinese are known as Krawk; in Shan, they are called Khe. In the Wa language, spoken in the borderlands between Yunnan Province and Shan State, the word for Chinese is Hox/Hawx, pronounced .

Ancestral origins
The Hakkas, Hokkiens and Cantonese comprised 45 per cent of the ethnic Chinese population. The Yunnanese comprised 30 to 40 per cent of the ethnic Chinese population.

Hokkien

 Hokkiens (Burmese: eingyi shay,  or let shay) from Fujian Province. Most of the Hokkien were traders.

Cantonese

 Cantonese (Burmese: eingyi to,  or let to) from Central Guangdong Province. Most migrants from Guangdong Province were artisans.

Hakkas
 Hakkas (Burmese: zaka) from Fujian and Guangdong provinces.

The Hakkas are further subdivided into those with ancestry from Fujian Province and Guangdong Province, called eingyi shay haka and eingyi to haka respectively.

Kokang
In Upper Myanmar and Shan Hills, the Kokang people predominate there.

Panthay
The Panthay have long been considered distinct from the Han Chinese diaspora community. They are Chinese Muslims who are called Hui in China.

Finally, there are the tayoke kabya of mixed Chinese and indigenous Burmese parentage. The kabya (meaning "mixed heritage") have a tendency to follow the customs of the Chinese more than of the Burmese. Indeed, tayoke kabya who follow Burmese customs are absorbed into and largely indistinguishable from mainstream Burmese society. A large portion of Burmese Chinese is thought to have some kabya blood, possibly because immigrants could acquire Burmese citizenship through intermarriage with the indigenous Burmese peoples.

Socioeconomics

Education
The Burmese Chinese place a high importance on education and represent a disproportionately high share of those with advanced (medical, engineering or doctorate) degrees in Myanmar. The figure would be higher still had it not been for the longstanding ban on those without Burmese citizenship from pursuing advanced degrees when Ne Win instigated the 1982 Citizenship Law further restricted Burmese citizenship for Burmese Chinese (as it stratified citizenship into three categories: full, associate, and naturalised) and severely limited Burmese Chinese, especially those without full citizenship and those holding FRCs, from attending professional tertiary schools, including medical, engineering, agricultural and economics institutions. Many wealthy Sino-Burmese families send their children to the city's English language schools for primary and secondary education and Chinese and Singaporean Universities for education.  Presently, many wealthy Burmese Chinese send their children overseas — in particular to Thailand, Malaysia and Singapore, for advanced studies. Taiwan is also a major destination, as the Taiwanese government offers aid and scholarship incentives to 'returning' overseas Chinese to study and settle there.

Until vast nationalisation by the Ne Win's government happened in 1963, most Burmese Chinese were enrolled in schools where Mandarin Chinese was the medium of instruction with Burmese as a second language. Notable Chinese schools at that time include:
 Burma-Chinese High School (緬甸華僑中學）
 Nanyang High School (緬甸南洋中學）- now Basic Education High School No. 2 Bahan
 Rangoon Chinese Elementary School (仰光華僑小學）
 Kee Mei Elementary School (仰光集美小學)

Employment
Historically, Burmese Chinese have made their livelihoods as merchants, traders, and shopkeepers as well as manual labourers such as indentured labourers (pejoratively called "coolies"); dockers, municipal workers, rickshaw men, and pony cart drivers. They were also heavily represented in certain professions such as civil servants, university lecturers, pharmacists, opticians, lawyers, engineers, and doctors.

Trade and industry

Like much of Southeast Asia, Chinese entrepreneurs dominate Burmese commerce at every level of society. Burmese Chinese wield tremendous economic clout and influence over their indigenous Burman majority counterparts and play a critical role in maintaining the country's economic vitality and prosperity. As a disproportionate wealthy, market-dominant minority not only form a distinct ethnic community, they also form an economically commercial middle and upper class in contrast to the poorer Burmese majority working class around them. Much of Burma's foreign investment capital has been backed by expatriate mainland and overseas Chinese investors who channelled capital for new startup companies and foreign business acquisitions through bamboo networks (Overseas Chinese business networks). Many members of the Burmese Chinese business community act as operating agents, doing business and investment biddings for mainland and overseas Chinese investors outside of Burma. As Burmese Chinese entrepreneurs became more financially prosperous, they often coalesced their financial resources and pooled large sums of seed capital together to forge joint business ventures.

In 1988, the State Law and Order Restoration Council (SLORC) came to power, and gradually loosened the government's role in the economy, encouraging private sector growth and foreign investment. This liberalisation of the state's role in the economy gave Chinese-owned Burmese businesses extra space to expand and assert their economic clout. Today, much of Burma's retail, wholesale, and shipping outlets are Chinese-owned. For example, Sein Gayha, a major Burmese retailer that began in Yangon's Chinatown in 1985, is owned by a Burmese family of Hakka ancestry. Moreover, Burmese businessmen of Chinese ancestry controlled the nations four of the five largest commercial banks in the 1990s and 2000s: Myanmar Universal Bank, Yoma Bank, Myanmar Mayflower Bank, and the Asia Wealth Bank. Newly settled Han Chinese immigrants following Burma's acceptance of free-market capitalism in the late 1980s began to capitalise on new business opportunities that they specialised in. Various businesses that have sprung up include Chinese-style patisseries and bakeries, noodle shops, watch repair, cosmetic shops, and grocery stores which soon at the forefront became the nerve-centers of economic life across various small towns in Burma. Over time, as the Chinese immigrants became more ambitious in business, they sought more aggressive entrepreneurial and investment activities, such as liquour stores and pawn brokerage shops. 

Today, Burma's Chinese community is now at the forefront of opening up the country's economy to conduct foreign business and direct investment, especially catering it towards mainland China and other Overseas Chinese businesspeople and investors. The Chinese government has been very proactive in engaging with the Overseas Chinese business community and using China's soft power to help Burma's Chinese community stay close to their ancestral roots and foster business ties. Foreign investment from mainland China continues to be channelled through Overseas Chinese bamboo networks today

Like other Southeast Asian businesses owned by those of Chinese ancestry, Chinese-owned businesses in Burma often make corporate partnerships with other Chinese and Overseas Chinese businesses to focus on new business opportunities to collaborate and concentrate on. However, most Burmese businessmen and investors have voluntarily chosen to stay in Burma or concentrate their efforts on surrounding Southeast Asian markets such as Malaysia, Singapore, and Thailand or the Greater Chinese market including mainland China, Hong Kong, Macau, and Taiwan. Many Burmese entrepreneurs of Chinese ancestry also have friends and extended family members in mainland China, as China's economic reform in the late 1970s produced conditions supporting wealth accumulation by introducing the wholesale market of Chinese-made products into Burma and other Southeast Asian markets. Besides sharing a common ancestry, cultural, linguistic, and familial ties, Chinese Burmese business success and entrepreneurial dynamism has been attributed towards a confluence of being flexible and adaptable towards changing business environments and economic climates, an desire to acquire wealth and business networks, a culture of hard work and delayed gratification and prudentially in a business setting, an ability to sell and market and making the most of the opportunities when they present themselves, looking towards the future, and upholding family honour.

Chinese businesses in Mandalay

Chinese enclaves have sprung up in major cities, particularly in Mandalay. Mandalay is now the economic and financial nerve center of Upper Myanmar and is considered the epicenter of Burmese Chinese business culture. After the 1980 fires in Mandalay, huge swaths of land left vacant by the fires were purchased, mostly by the ethnic Han Chinese, many of whom were recent immigrants from Yunnan. This influx transformed Mandalay rapidly into the prosperous business center with Chinese-built and Chinese-owned high-rise buildings. Since the 19th century, as Mandalay became more economically prosperous, large influxes of Han Chinese immigrants have continued to settle there, resulting the Sinicization of the entire city. Under the auspicious of the entrepreneurial Chinse minority, Mandalay became a booming modern metropolis filled with foreign businesses and gem trading centers. Many Chinese-owned and operated Burmese businesses such as trading cooperatives, market stalls, food joints, medicine shops, hotels, and gem shops have also flourished. 

Today, the percentage of ethnic Han Chinese, is estimated at 50% of the city (with the Yunnanese forming an estimated 30% of Mandalay's population). In addition, the apparent influence of mainland China is also ostensibly felt throughout the city, where the local inhabitants have resentfully alluded to Mandalay as a "Chinese city." Many Chinese in Myanmar walk a line between the improving tolerance and aggravating ethnic Bamar, including learning local languages to assimilate. 

Chinese entrepreneurs became increasingly prominent in Mandalay's economy since the imposition of sanctions by the United States and the European Union in the 1990s. During Burma's open-door immigration policy in the 1990s, Mandalay became the most attractive destination for massive Chinese migration and newly settled Han Chinese immigrants. Han Chinese immigrants from Yunnan were able to obtain identity papers on the black market to become naturalised Burmese citizens overnight. Identity cards were not only used for new Chinese immigrants to stay indefinitely, but to also bypass legal barriers on foreign ownership of businesses such as hotels, shops, and restaurants. With the onset of economic liberalisation and the rise of free market capitalism in Burma, members of the Chinese community gravitated towards business and the Chinese paradigm of guanxi which is based on the importance of having contacts, relationships, and connections as ingredients for entrepreneurial and investment success. Retail stores were opened by Chinese entrepreneurs, whose business interests ranged from cement mixing to financial services. Ambitious Chinese entrepreneurs and investors came to dominate the economies of Yangon and Mandalay and turned them into the prosperous business and financial centers that they are today. 

Mandalay has been sinicised economically and culturally, to the resentment of indigenous Burmese. About 50 per cent of the land in Downtown Mandalay is controlled by the Chinese. Large commercial real estate project, such as a hotels and shopping centers, are typically under the hands of a Chinese real estate entrepreneur. In addition, more than 50 per cent of the economic activity generated in Downtown Mandalay is derived from the plethora of Chinese-owned businesses that predominate the area. About 80% of the hotels and guesthouses, more than 70 per cent of the restaurants, 45-80 per cent of gold and jewellery shops, about 30 per cent of jade and gemstone trading, and nearly 100 per cent of the sale centers for mainland Chinese-made commodities in Mandalay are owned and operated by Chinese. In addition, all of Mandalay's shopping malls and hotels were built and owned by Chinese construction and real estate development companies.

Chinese Industry in Burma

Today, virtually all of Mandalay's and Yangon's retail shops, hotels, restaurants, financial services providers, and prime residential and commercial real estate operate under Chinese hands. Prime real estate in key sites within Mandalay have been entirely acquired by wealthy Chinese businessmen and investors. New Han Chinese migrant investors came with vast amounts of capital, have also invested in wholesale marketing and jade mining industries. Gemstones and gold bars are among the many the goods sold on the Burmese commodities market and represent a key focus commodity of value by many Chinese expatriate entrepreneurs and investors. Foreign buyers of jade and gems flock to the city of Mandalay, with clients from Hong Kong continuing to be the main customers.

Between 1895 and 1930, Chinese-owned Burmese businesses were initially concentrated within three sectors: Brokerage, manufacturing, and contracting. Under British colonial rule, the Chinese share of the businesses was reduced significantly from 28.5 to 10 per cent in manufacturing, 26.6 to 1.8 per cent in brokerage, and 31 to 4.3 per cent in contracting while Burmese Indians improved their economic positions significantly and controlled a larger proportion of the businesses within the three sectors. From 1895 to 1930, the Chinse share in banking and money-lending went from 33.3 per cent to nonexistent at 0 per cent market share. Industries where the Chinese share increased included milling (0 to 4.5 per cent), agents (13.3 to 15.6 per cent), shopkeeping (6.7 to 18.3 per cent), and merchanting (12.3 to 13.1 per cent). During the last few decades of the 19th century, the Chinese turned to rural money-lending as an additive business and investment revenue stream. Burmese businessmen of Chinese ancestry also ran illicit opium and gambling dens, teahouses, liquor stores, and also acted as agents for the production, sale, and export of petroleum and natural gas products.

Artisan goods manufactured historically by indigenous Burmans have been increasingly displaced by inexpensive Chinese consumer goods such as textiles, machinery, and electronics in terms of quality and price. Historical sources of livelihood for Bamar like tapestry weaving, gold leaf carving, furniture crafting, and precious stone polishing no longer provide enough wages to keep up with increase Chinese consumer good prices. Furthermore, artisan products have been eclipsed by cheaper Chinese imports and higher quality Chinese-made products. Burmese entrepreneurs of Chinese ancestry dominate every major Burmese artisan business and industry sector including silk weaving, tapestry, jade cutting and polishing, stone and wood carving, making marble and bronze Buddha images, food products, temple ornaments and paraphernalia, the working of gold leaves and of silver, garments, pharmaceuticals, match manufacturing, brewing, and distilling. Burmese entrepreneurs of Chinese ancestry have also established heavy industry joint ventures with many large mainland Chinese conglomerates. For example, the lucrative teak industry has provided Sino-Burmese conglomerates with incredible profit while ethnic Bamar and Shan people have barely earned money due to government tax exemptions, low labour wages and global-export orientated policies. Chinese-made consumer electronics, beer, and fashion are also large industries. In Yangon, the Hokkien community have cornered small and medium-sized family businesses in teak logging, rice, bean and legume trading, and cooking oil production while the Cantonese community are well known for their niches in the small-scale manufacturing of handicrafts and similar artisan retail products.

Chinese trade in Myanmar

Legal two-way trade between Burma and mainland China reached US$1.5 billion annually by 1988. Additional Chinese trade, investment, economic, and military aid was sought to invigorate and jumpstart the re-emerging Burmese economy. In order for the Chinese community to secure and protect their economic interests, the Burmese Chinese Chamber of Commerce developed as a guild, association, business nerve center, and lobby group for local Burmese businessmen and investors of Chinese ancestry. The Malaysian business magnate and investor Robert Kuok converted Mandalay and Yangon into the largest economic hubs for Burmese, mainland, and overseas Chinese business networking and large-scale corporate deal-making in Burma. 

The Han Chinese who dominate Burma's jade industry have been the chief driving force behind Burma's gem mining industry and jade exports. Private gem mining is a huge industry in Burma with many of the concessionaires being controlled by Burmese entrepreneurs of Chinese ancestry. At present, Burma's booming gem industry involves Chinese hands at every level, from the financiers, concession operators, all the way to the retail merchants that own the many newly opened gem markets and stores. In 2003, one Chinese-owned jeweller reportedly controlled 100 gem mines producing over 2,000 kilograms of raw rubies annually. These coveted pieces of expensive jewellery typically cater to customers mainly hailing from Hong Kong and Taiwan. 

Burmese entrepreneurs of Chinese ancestry are not just dominant in the big business sector, but also in the small and medium-sized business sector. Small and medium-sized enterprises that the Chinese have dominated include retail sales of bicycle tires, auto parts, electrical equipment, textiles, precious metals, machinery, ironmongery, hardware, printing, bookbinding, books and stationery, tailoring, laundromats, dry-cleaning, jewellery, language training, tutoring, and money exchanges. Beauty parlors, construction sites, mobile phone sale centers, traditional Chinese medical clinics, restaurants, pubs, dry cleaners, laundromats, cafes, teahouses, casinos, gambling dens, breweries, nightclubs, hotels, and karaoke bars were also common Chinese-run establishments. 

The Chinese dominate both the legitimate trade and the highly lucrative illegitimate trade in opium and other unsavory drug enterprises. High-profile cases have involved the Burmese Chinese business elite such as businessman Lo Hsing Han in Kokang and politician Kyaw Win. In the legal economy, both have continued to control Burma's major banks, airlines, teak logging companies, and gemstone mining concessions. Lo's son, Steven Law is also a prominent businessman known for being at the helm of Burma's largest conglomerate company Asia World, whose investments include a container shipping operator, port buildings, and toll road authorities. Law also has business interests in sports, where he is the majority owner of Magway FC, a Burmese soccer team, and has holdings in Burma's gem industry valued at an estimated US$600 million. His other holdings include numerous valuable ruby concessions as well as a stake in a mining concession situated near the Burmese town of Phakent. Given Law's notoriety in Burmese business circles, his conglomerate is also the most popular business partner for foreign investors looking to invest in Burma's private gem industry.

Chinese investment in Myanmar 

An influx of foreign capital investment from mainland China, Germany, and France has led to the development of new potential construction projects across Burma. Mainland China's outpouring of investment into the country provided financial backing for new startup infrastructure projects.> Many of these infrastructure projects are in the hands of Chinese construction contractors and civil engineers with large scale construction undertakings of various projects including irrigation dams, highways, bridges, ground satellite stations, and an international airport for Mandalay. Burmese entrepreneurs of Chinese ancestry have also established numerous joint ventures and corporate partnerships with mainland Chinese State-owned enterprises for the construction of oil pipelines.

Burmese attitudes and responses
As Chinese economic influence might grew, much of the indigenous Bamar majority have gradually been driven out into poorer land on the hills, on the outskirts of major Burmese cities or into the mountains. Disenchantment has grown among the displaced indigenous Burmese hill tribes who felt they were unable compete with Chinese-owned businesses in a free market capitalist system. During the Burmese property boom in the 1990s, Chinese real estate investors began building and speculating as property values doubled and tripled, which resulted indigenous Burmese being pushed further away from their native homes and displaced into the outskirts of major Burmese cities towards impoverished shantytowns. Underlying resentment and bitterness from the impoverished Burmese majority has been accumulating as there has been no existence of indigenous Burmese having any substantial business equity in Burma. The increased economic clout held in the hands of the Chinese in Burma has triggered distrust, envy, resentment and anti-Chinese hostility among the indigenous Burmese majority. Decades of free market liberalisation brought virtually no economic benefit to the indigenous Burmese majority but rather the opposite resulting a subjugated indigenous Burmese majority underclass, many of whom still engage in menial labour, rural peasantry or illegal teak smuggling to make ends meet in a stark socioeconomic contrast to their modern, wealthier, and cosmopolitan middle and upper class Chinese counterparts. Thousands of displaced Burmese hill tribes and aborigines live in satellite shantytowns on the outskirts of Mandalay in economic destitution, with the glaring wealth disparity and abject poverty among the indigenous Burmese aborigines has resulted hostility blaming their socioeconomic ills on foreign domination, exploitation, and looting of their country by a relative handful of outsiders, namely Chinese.

Culture

Language

Most Burmese Chinese speak Burmese in their daily life. Those with higher education also speak Standard Chinese and/or English. The use of Chinese dialects still prevails. Hokkien (a dialect of Min Nan from Quanzhou, Zhangzhou and Jinjiang) and Taishanese (a Yue dialect akin to Cantonese) from Taishan and Xinhui are mostly used in Yangon as well as in Lower Myanmar, while Yunnanese Mandarin is well preserved in Upper Myanmar.

Although General Ne Win's rule (1962–1988) enacted the ban on Chinese-language schools that caused a decline of Mandarin speakers, the number of Chinese schools is growing again. (Note: Standard Chinese refers to the national language of the PRC and Taiwan, distinct from the Southwestern Mandarin dialect of the Upper Myanmar, Kokang and Panthay). At the end of 2012, Mizzima News reported that an increasing number of young Burmese Chinese are expressing interest in Chinese language, taking language courses even when their parents don't understand Chinese. However, this trend is not necessarily indicative of an interest in joining Chinese community or cultural organisations, as many of their parents did. Groups like the Myanmar Overseas Young Chinese League report a lack of interest from Burmese Chinese youth.

Religion
Most Burmese Chinese practice Theravada Buddhism, while incorporating some Mahayana Buddhist and Taoist beliefs including ancestral worship. There are also some prominent Theravadin Buddhist meditation teacher of Chinese descent like Sayadaw U Tejaniya. There are several notable Chinese temples situated in Yangon, including Fushan Temple (dedicated to Qingshui Zhushi), Kheng Hock Keong Temple (dedicated to Mazu) and Guanyin Gumiao Temple (dedicated to Guanyin).

"little flowers") originated from Yunnan are mainly Muslim.

Names
The Burmese Chinese have Burmese names and many also have Chinese names. Given names in various Chinese dialects are often transliterated into the Burmese language, using phonetic transcriptions or translated. For example, a Burmese Chinese person named 'Khin Aung' may have the Chinese name of 慶豐 (Hokkien POJ: Khèng-hong), with '慶' (Hokkien POJ: khèng) corresponding to 'Khin', and '豐' (Hokkien POJ: hong) corresponding to 'Aung'. However, variations of transcription do exist (between dialects), and some Burmese Chinese do not choose to adopt similar-sounding Burmese and Chinese names. Because the Burmese lack surnames, many Burmese Chinese tend to pass on portions of their given names to future generations, for the purpose of denoting lineage.

According to publications of Long Shan Tang, a clan association based in Yangon, the ten most common Chinese surnames in Yangon are:
 Lee/Li (李)
 Peng/Pang (彭)
 Shi/See/Si (時)
 Dong/Tung (董)
 Min/Man (閔)
 Niu/Ngau (牛)
 Pian/Pin (邊)
 Hsin (辛)
 Kwan (關)
 Khaw (許)

In Myanmar, the majority of Chinese surnames are Lim 林, Tan 陈, Yang 杨, Lee 李, Chou 周, Wang 王, Chang 张, Su 苏, Huang 黄, Yeh 叶, Hsu 许, Fang 方 and Wu 吴

Cuisine

Burmese Chinese cuisine is based on Chinese cuisine, particularly from Fujian, Guangdong and Yunnan provinces, with local influences. Spices such as turmeric and chili are commonly used. Also, the use of soy sauce, bean curd, bean sprouts, Chinese pickled mustards, and dried mushrooms can be attributed to Chinese influence. The following is a partial list of Chinese contributions to Burmese cuisine. These are an established part of today's Burmese cuisine, and are hardly differentiated as a foreign cuisine.

 : steamed buns
 : roasted duck
 : fried Chinese doughnut
 : fried rice
 : mooncake
 : thin rice noodle soup
 : thin wheat noodles
 : rice porridge
 : Panthay-style fried noodles
 : literally "noodles laced in cooked oil," usually with chicken
 : literally "beehoon soup with chicken or pork,"
 : noodle with thick starchy gravy

History

Pre-colonial
The earliest records of Chinese migration into present-day Myanmar were in the Song and Ming dynasties. In the 18th century, Ming Dynasty princes settled in Kokang (the northern part of present-day Myanmar). Chinese traders, however, travelled as far as the capital city as well as northern towns on the Irrawaddy such as Bhamo. Some of them stayed and started a Chinese community at Amarapura, and when King Mindon moved his capital to Mandalay in 1859, the Chinese were the only community that decided to stay behind. Many of their descendants intermarried into the host society and remain important and respected citizens of Amarapura.

British Colonial period

Another wave of immigration occurred in the 19th century under the British colonial administration. Britain encouraged immigration of the Indians and Chinese to British Burma, and such incentives for work opportunities and enterprise and for accumulating wealth attracted many Chinese immigrants. They primarily came to Burma via British Malaya. The Chinese quickly became dominant in the highly lucrative rice and gem industries. Many Chinese merchants and traders owning both wholesale and retail businesses. Unlike in British Malaya, where most Chinese were coolie labourers, the Chinese in Burma were largely from the artisan and merchant classes.

They integrated well into Burmese society not least because they, like the Bamar, were of Sino-Tibetan stock and were Buddhists, implicit in the nickname pauk hpaw (lit. "sibling"). During British rule, marriage between the Chinese and Burmese, particularly Chinese men and Burmese women, was the most common form of intermarriage in Burma, as evidenced by a High Court ruling on the legal status of Sino-Burmese marriages under Burmese Buddhist law. From 1935 until the end of British rule, the Chinese were represented in the colonial legislature, the House of Representatives.

After World War II, displaced Burmese Chinese (whose pre-war homes were in Burma), were the most numerous group of overseas Chinese in Southeast Asia to request repatriation to return to Burma, according to the United Nations Relief and Rehabilitation Administration.

Post-independence

During the 1950s, Burma was one of the first countries to recognise the People's Republic of China as a nation. However, its own Chinese population was treated as aliens. The Burmese Chinese were issued foreign registration cards (FRC) in a tiered citizenship system adopted by the post-independence government. When the Chinese Communists expelled the Kuomintang, many fled to Myanmar and Thailand over the borders of Yunnan Province. The Burmese government fought and removed the armed KMT and forced them to Taiwan; those who managed to stay prospered. In the 1950s, discriminatory policies against overseas Chinese encompassed citizenship, government employment, approval for business regulations and licensing, loan extensions and permission to make remittances.

In 1952, Kheng Hock Keong Temple publications estimated that ethnic Chinese, who lived in enclaves in the area along Sinohdan, Latha, and Maung Khaing Streets (with Cantonese typically living above Maha Bandula Road and Hokkiens living below), constituted 9.5 per cent of Rangoon's population. During this period, there was a sharp rise in the number of private Chinese language schools, primarily teaching Mandarin, in Burma, from 65 in 1935 to 259 in 1953 and 259 at its peak in 1962, with many such schools affiliated to the Chinese nationalist (lit. "White Chinese") or communist (lit. "Red Chinese") movements. However, fewer than 10 per cent of Burmese Chinese of school age attended Chinese language schools. Similarly, about 80 clan associations operated in the 1950s.

Socialist rule
In 1962, Ne Win led the Socialist coup d'état, establishing the Revolutionary Council under the Burmese Way to Socialism. In February 1963, the Enterprise Nationalization Law was passed, effectively nationalising all major industries and prohibiting the formation of new factories. This law adversely affected many industrialists and entrepreneurs, especially those without the full citizenship. The government's economic nationalisation program further prohibited foreigners, including the non-citizen Chinese, from owning land, sending remittances, getting business licences and practising medicine. Such policies led to the beginnings of a major exodus of Burmese Chinese to other countries—some 100,000 Chinese left Burma.

Although a kabya himself, Ne Win banned Chinese-language education and created other measures to compel the Chinese to leave. Ne Win's government stoked up racial animosity and ethnic conflicts against the Indians and Chinese Burmese, who were terrorised by Burmese citizens, the most violent riots taking place in 1967. All schools were nationalised, including Chinese language schools. Beginning in 1967 and continuing throughout the 1970s, anti-Chinese riots as well as Anti-Indian sentiment continued to flare up and many believed they were covertly supported by the government. Similarly, Chinese shops were looted and set on fire. Public attention was successfully diverted by Ne Win from the uncontrollable inflation, scarcity of consumer items and rising prices of rice. The 1982 Citizenship Law further restricted Burmese citizenship for Burmese Chinese (as it stratified citizenship into three categories: full, associate, and naturalised) and severely limited Burmese Chinese, especially those without full citizenship and those holding FRCs, from attending professional tertiary schools, including medical, engineering, agricultural and economics institutions. During this period, the country's failing economy and widespread discrimination accelerated an emigration of Burmese Chinese out of Burma.

Modern era

In 1988, the State Law and Order Restoration Council (SLORC) came to power, and gradually loosened the government's role in the economy, encouraging private sector growth and foreign investment. This liberalisation of state's role in the economy, if slight and uneven, nonetheless gave the ethnic Chinese-led businesses extra space to expand and reassert their economic power. Today, the majority of retail, wholesale and import trade businesses are run by the Burmese Chinese today. For example, Sein Gayha, a major retailer that began in Yangon's Chinatown in 1985, is owned by a Hakka Chinese family. Moreover, four of the five largest commercial banks in Myanmar, Myanmar Universal Bank, Yoma Bank, Myanmar Mayflower Bank, and the Asia Wealth Bank, were all founded by Sino-Burmese.

Today, the majority of Burmese Chinese live in the major cities of Yangon, Mandalay, Taunggyi, Bago, and their surrounding areas. Although there are Chinatowns (tayoke tan) in the major cities, the Chinese are widely dispersed throughout the country. Yangon is home to nearly 100,000 Chinese. The northern region of Myanmar has seen a recent influx of mainland Chinese  migrant workers, black market traders and gamblers. In Kachin State, which borders China in three directions, Standard Chinese is the lingua franca.

Upper Myanmar has seen a demographic shift resulting from the recent immigration of many Mainland Chinese to Mandalay Region, Shan, and Kachin States. Ethnic Chinese now constitute an estimated 30 to 40 per cent of Mandalay's population. Huge swaths of land in city centre left vacant by the fires were later illegally purchased, mostly by the ethnic Chinese, many of whom were recent illegal immigrants from Yunnan. The Chinese influx accelerated after the current military government came to power in 1988. With the Burmese government turning a blind eye, many Chinese immigrants in the 1990s settling in Mandalay. In the 1990s alone, about 250,000 to 300,000 Yunnanese were estimated to have migrated to Mandalay. The Mandalay's population from about 500,000 in 1980 to one million in 2008 and the percentage of local Burmese reduced to less than 50. Chinese festivals are now firmly embedded in the city's cultural calendar. The strong influx of Mainland Chinese immigrants into Mandalay coupled with the presence of strong Chinese economic clout resulted the subsequent displacement of indigenous Burmese to the outskirts of the city creating racial tensions between the two communities.

There are also substantial Burmese Chinese communities outside of Myanmar, particularly in Taiwan, Macau, Hong Kong, Singapore, United States (such as New York City's Henry Street) and Australia. Zhonghe District, near Taipei, Taiwan is home to 40,000 Burmese Chinese (2008), one of the largest communities outside of Myanmar.

Notable Burmese Chinese

See also

 China–Burma relations
 Kokang people
 Thai Chinese
 Rangoon

Further reading

References

External links
 Newidea! Myanmar information website
 Burma Overseas Chinese Student Association
 Overseas Chinese Affairs Office of the State Council of the People's Republic of China (Chinese-language only)
 Overseas Chinese Affairs Commission, R.O.C.
 Chronology of Chinese-Burmese Relations of The Irrawaddy
 Home away from Home
 Governing the Chinese in multi-ethnic colonial Burma between the 1890s and 1920s
 Twentieth century impressions of Burma : its history, people, commerce, industries, and resources
 Yeo Cheow Kaw and Rangoon Kian Teik Tong
 Southeast Asian Personalities of Chinese Descent: Biographical dictionary
 Chinese in Colonial Burma: A Migrant Community in A Multiethnic State

 
Chinese
Immigration to Myanmar